Ormancık can refer to:

 Ormancık, Anamur
 Ormancık, Feke
 Ormancık, Karakoçan
 Ormancık, Savur